Cosy Dens is a 1999 Czech film directed by Jan Hřebejk. It is loosely based on the novel Hovno Hoří (Czech: "Flaming Feces") by Petr Šabach. It was voted the best Czech film by Reflex magazine in 2011.

Plot summary
Pelíšky is a bittersweet coming-of-age story set in the months from Christmas 1967 leading up to the ill-fated 1968 Prague Spring. Teenager Michal Šebek (Michael Beran) has a crush on his upstairs neighbour, Jindřiška Krausová (Kristýna Nováková). Michal's family is headed by a stubborn army officer who is a firm supporter of the communist system and who believes that communist technology will eventually triumph over 'western imperialist capitalism', while Jindřiška's father is an ardent foe of the Communists and a war hero, who has been imprisoned several times because of his outspoken opposition to the regime; he believes that "the Bolsheviks have a year left at most, maybe two".  In contrast, the younger generation couldn't care less for politics. Instead, Michal sports a Beatles mop-top while Elien (Ondřej Brousek), the local hipster whose parents live in the USA, runs a local film group specialising in Hollywood and pre-war French films, while Jindřiška becomes Elien's girlfriend.  After a wedding that unites the families, the film ends with the news breaking of the invasion of the Warsaw Pact.

A dispute in the film illustrates the tension between the nationalistic and stalwartly anti-Communist father and Jindřiška, who is more apolitical.  Jindřiška dares to suggest that her mother’s dumplings are closer to Italian gnocchi than traditional Czech knedliky (translated as "Viennese dumplings" in the English subtitles), sending her father into a rage.  The plastic spoon on the poster refers to the gifts, miracles of "socialist science", that a Šebek uncle keeps sending the family and which always fail to perform as promised, humiliating Mr. Šebek.  Both cases foreshadow how the political hopes of the fathers are destroyed by the coming Soviet invasion.

Trivia
Pelíšky was screened at the 1999 Vancouver Film Festival.

The Czech title is a plural and diminutive of the word "pelech", literally meaning animal den or burrow. It is used figuratively for a cosy hideout.

Cast
Michael Beran as Michal Šebek
Ondřej Brousek as Elien
Miroslav Donutil as Mr. Šebek
Jaroslav Dušek as Saša Mašláň
Eva Holubová as Eva (Teacher)
Boris Hybner as Magician
Sylvie Koblížková as Uzlinka Šebková
Jiří Kodet as Mr. Kraus
Jiří Krejčík as Doctor Stárek
Marek Morvai as Petr
Kristýna Nováková as Jindřiška Krausová
Bolek Polívka as Uncle
Simona Stašová as Mrs. Šebková
Emília Vášáryová as Mrs. Krausová
Stella Zázvorková as Grandmother

Soundtrack
The Pelíšky soundtrack was released in April, 1999, and contains clips of some of the actors memorable lines in addition to the musical numbers.
 Blue Effect - "Slunečný hrob"
 Miroslav Kaman, Jaroslav Dušek - "Dvě dávky" 
 Václav Neckář - "Tu kytaru jsem koupil kvůli tobě"
 Boleslav Polívka - "Nebe na zemi" 
 Kristýna Nováková, Michael Beran, Ondřej Brousek - "Kozačky..." 
 Petr Novák & Flamengo - "Povídej" 
 Kristýna Nováková, Michael Beran - "Něco jako příbuzný" 
 Waldemar Matuška - "Pojď se mnou, lásko má" 
 Emília Vášáryová, Jiří Kodet - "Dávám bolševikovi rok" 
 Hana Hegerová - "Čerešně"
 Miroslav Donutil, Boleslav Polívka, Silvie Koblížková - "Nerozbitná sklenička" 
 Kučerovci - "Ajo mama" 
 Miroslav Donutil, Michael Beran - "Gagarinův bratr" 
 Kučerovci - "La mulher rendeira" 
 Stella Zázvorková, Simona Stašová, Miroslav Donutil, Boleslav Polívka - "Maršál Malinovskij" 
 Judita Čeřovská - "Je po dešti" 
 Eva Holubová, Jaroslav Dušek, Marek Morvai-Javorský - "Vyděržaj, pijaněr" 
 Václav Neckář - "Lékořice" 
 Emília Vášáryová, Kristýna Nováková, Jiří Kodet - "Noky"
 Karel Gott - "Santa lucia" 
 Miroslav Donutil, Boleslav Polívka, Jiří Kodet - "Kde udělali soudruzi z NDR chybu?" 
 Waldemar Matuška - "Mrholí" 
 Eva Holubová, Jaroslav Dušek, Marek Morvai-Javorský - "Hoří hovno? ..." 
 Karel Gott & Olympic - "Trezor" 
 Jiří Kodet - "Proletáři všech zemí ..." 
 Matadors - "Get Down From The Tree" 
 Soulmen - "Baby Do Not Cry" 
 Soulmen - "I Wish I Were" 
 Blue Effect - "Snakes" 
 Miroslav Donutil, Boleslav Polívka - "Průměrná ženská" 
 Blue Effect - "Sluneční hrob"

References

External links

 
 Soundtrack Listing

Cosy Dens at Eurochannel
 Pelíšky (Cosy Dens) available for buying on www.czechmovie.com

1999 films
Czech coming-of-age films
Films directed by Jan Hřebejk
Prague Spring
Communism in fiction
Films set in Prague
Czechoslovakia in fiction
Czech Lion Awards winners (films)
Warsaw Pact invasion of Czechoslovakia
1990s Czech-language films
1990s coming-of-age films